Paula Garcés (born March 20, 1974) is a Colombian and American actress. She is known for her appearance in films such as Clockstoppers, Man of the House and the Harold & Kumar series, and on TV shows such as CSI: Miami, On My Block, The Shield, Law & Order: Special Victims Unit, The Sopranos, Oz, Devious Maids, Guiding Light and All My Children.

Early life 
Paula Garcés was born on March 20, 1974, in Medellín, Colombia. At a very early age she moved to East Harlem in New York City.

Career

Acting 
She played Alvina in 1995's Dangerous Minds with Michelle Pfeiffer.

Garcés co-starred in Paramount Pictures' 2002 teen sci-fi adventure Clockstoppers, starring opposite Jesse Bradford. She was then cast in Richard Benjamin's hip-hop comedy Marci X opposite Lisa Kudrow and Damon Wayans.

Garcés was next seen opposite Academy Award-winner Tommy Lee Jones in the Revolution Studios feature Man of the House. In 2004, she starred in National Lampoon's Pledge This!. She was featured on CSI: Miami and starred in a four episode arc on NBC's Law and Order: Special Victims Unit, as well as guest spots on HBO's hit series The Sopranos and Oz. Garcés then landed a role as a cast member on The Shield.

Garcés appeared in New Line Cinema's 2004 feature film Harold & Kumar Go to White Castle, its 2008 sequel Harold & Kumar Escape from Guantanamo Bay and the 2011 sequel A Very Harold & Kumar 3D Christmas, as Maria, the love interest and later wife of John Cho's character.

Garcés was a series regular on the ABC drama series Defying Gravity, playing documentarian Paula Morales during its single 2009 season.

She was also featured in the video "Imagínate" with Wisin & Yandel, and rapper T-Pain.

Garcés has also co-starred on Guiding Light as Pilar Santos, and had a recurring role as Dr. Kelly Hernandez in season two of the Syfy TV series Warehouse 13.

In May 2011, Garcés appeared in "Off the Beaten Path", the 11th episode of season one of Breakout Kings.

In February 2013, Garcés appeared on the CBS series Elementary, playing villainous police officer Paula Reyes in season one's episode "Details".

Garcés also plays Ruby's mom in On My Block, a Netflix series.

Aluna Comics 
While attending a Comic-Con to promote one of the Harold & Kumar films, Garcés noted the sizeable Latino audience for superheroes, despite the low number of Latino characters in the genre. She created Further Lane Productions  to issue a limited run comic book featuring the Latina superhero Aluna, later working with S2 Games to create, and voice, Aluna as a 2011 playable hero added to Heroes of Newerth, S2's multiplayer online battle arena video game. In time for the 2014 Comic-Con, she worked with sekretagent Productions and Allegory Media to produce a four issue Aluna comic book series. In 2019, Aluna was developed into an action RPG.

Personal life 
Garcés is a naturalized United States citizen. Her first child, daughter Skye Mahoney, was born in 1992. In 2002, she married entrepreneur and producer Antonio Hernandez. The couple have a son (born 2013).

Filmography

References

External links 

1974 births
Living people
20th-century Colombian actresses
21st-century American actresses
21st-century Colombian actresses
Actresses from New York City
American film actresses
American television actresses
Colombian emigrants to the United States
Colombian film actresses
Colombian television actresses
Hispanic and Latino American actresses
Naturalized citizens of the United States
People from East Harlem